At Home with Their Greatest Hits is a greatest hits album by The Partridge Family. Released in September 1972, it peaked at no. 21 on Billboard's Top LP's chart in early November 1972, and remained in the Top 200 for 23 weeks. The compilation features all six previously charted hits and four LP tracks from the previous albums, plus the album debut of the group's newest single.  Released in June 1972, The Partridges' cover of Neil Sedaka's "Breaking Up Is Hard to Do" became their seventh charted hit (US no. 28/UK no. 3).

Track listing
All tracks from the album were featured on the TV show (Seasons 1-3)

Fictional personnel (television) 
David Cassidy - electric and acoustic guitars, vocals
Shirley Jones - vocals
Susan Dey - Hammond organ, piano, vocals
Danny Bonaduce - electric bass guitar, backing vocals
Brian Forster - drums
Suzanne Crough - tambourine

Studio personnel
The actual musicians on the tracks included David Cassidy on lead vocals, Shirley Jones and the vocal group The Ron Hicklin Singers on backing vocals, and various prolific studio musicians such as Hal Blaine (drums), Larry Carlton (guitar), Joe Osborn (bass) and Larry Knechtel (keyboards) - arranged by Mike Melvoin.

Charts

References 

The Partridge Family albums
1972 greatest hits albums
Bell Records compilation albums
Albums produced by Wes Farrell